Dallas Divas & Daughters is an American reality television series on the Style Network and Bravo. The series debuted on October 4, 2009.

Premise
The series follows a group of wealthy socialites and their daughters who reside in the Dallas, Texas area starring Pamela Martin Duarte and her daughter Hannah Martin Duarte, Kenya Griffin and daughter Chanel Flowers along with an ensemble cast. One of the goals of the show was to dispel some of the myths and perceptions about Texas lifestyles in a humorous tongue in cheek manner.

Episodes

References

2000s American reality television series
2009 American television series debuts
2009 American television series endings
Style Network original programming
Television shows filmed in Texas
Culture of Dallas
Television shows set in Dallas